Dixeia orbona, the creamy small white, is a butterfly in the family Pieridae. It is found in Senegal, the Gambia, Guinea-Bissau, Burkina Faso, Ghana, Nigeria, Cameroon, Sudan, Ethiopia, the Democratic Republic of the Congo, Uganda, Kenya and Tanzania. The habitat consists of open woodland and open montane forests, particularly forest-grassland mosaic.

The larvae feed on Capparis species.

Subspecies
Dixeia orbona orbona (Senegal, the Gambia, Guinea-Bissau, Burkina Faso, northern Ghana, northern Nigeria, northern Cameroon)
Dixeia orbona vidua (Butler, 1900) (Sudan, Ethiopia, Democratic Republic of the Congo, Uganda, Kenya, Tanzania)

References

Seitz, A. Die Gross-Schmetterlinge der Erde 13: Die Afrikanischen Tagfalter. Plate XIII 14

Butterflies described in 1837
Pierini